Dimo Angelov Tonchev (born 27 December 1952) is a Bulgarian former cyclist. He competed at the 1972 Summer Olympics and 1976 Summer Olympics.

References

External links
 

1952 births
Living people
Bulgarian male cyclists
Olympic cyclists of Bulgaria
Cyclists at the 1972 Summer Olympics
Cyclists at the 1976 Summer Olympics
Sportspeople from Burgas